Natalie Denise Sperl (New Ulm, Brown County, Minnesota) is an American model and film and television actress, better known for her appearances in the films Mank, Succubus: Hell Bent, Rock Monster, and Around the World in 80 Days.

Career
An Esquire cover girl and former Coors Light Girl, starring with Kid Rock in the Coors Light Super Bowl commercial directed by Michael Bay, Sperl was a high fashion runway model in Europe working for such top designers as Cynthia Rowley and Alexander McQueen at Central St. Martins in London. From there she landed several magazine covers before moving to Los Angeles to be an actress. To date she has over 50 acting credits including hit TV shows Two and A Half Men, How I Met Your Mother, NCIS and more. This led to starring roles in numerous films including Rock Monster and the cult darling Succubus Hell-Bent. Currently you can see Natalie channel Greta Garbo in David Finchers’ Oscar winning film Mank on Netflix. 

Natalie honed her comedy skills at Second City Improv where she created several sketch characters and celebrity impersonations including Gwen Stefani and former First Lady Melania Trump among others. She would eventually develop these characters into her YouTube series, The Sperliegirl Show. Natalie has done Stand Up at The Comedy Store Belly Room, The Improv and The Comedy Union in Los Angeles.

She is a singer-songwriter and the front woman of the band Kill My Coquette.

Filmography

References

External links
 

People from New Ulm, Minnesota
Living people
American female models
American film actresses
American television actresses
American people of German descent
21st-century American women
Year of birth missing (living people)